Bruno Veselica (24 January 1936 – 20 November 2018) was a Croatia-born Yugoslav footballer.

Career
As a player, he was regarded as one of HNK Rijeka's best forwards of all time. He is the club's second highest top scorer of all time after Boško Bursać. He was the club's top scorer for five seasons. After more than ten years spent with Rijeka, he continued his career with Olimpija Ljubljana.

Honours
NK Rijeka
Yugoslav Second League: 1957-58

References

1936 births
2018 deaths
People from Labin
Footballers from Rijeka
Association football forwards
Yugoslav footballers
NK Rudar Labin players
HNK Rijeka players
NK Olimpija Ljubljana (1945–2005) players
Yugoslav First League players